Mildred Island is a submerged island in the San Joaquin River delta, in California. It is part of San Joaquin County. It flooded in 1983, and the land was abandoned. It appears on 1913 and 1952 United States Geological Survey maps of the area.

References

Islands of San Joaquin County, California
Islands of the Sacramento–San Joaquin River Delta
Islands of Northern California